Ulrik is a male name, a Scandinavian form of Ulrich. Ulrik may refer to:
Ulrik Frederik Christian Arneberg (1829–1911), Norwegian politician for the Conservative Party
Albert Ulrik Bååth (1853–1912), Swedish poet
Ulrik Balling (born 1975), Danish professional football player
Ulrik of Denmark (1578–1624)
Ulrik of Denmark (1611–1633)
Johan Ulrik Sebastian Gripenberg (1795–1869), Finnish politician
Christian Ulrik Gyldenløve (1611–1640), Danish diplomat and military officer
Hans Ulrik Gyldenløve (1615–1645), Danish diplomat
Ulrik Christian Gyldenløve (1630–1658), illegitimate child of Christian IV of Denmark and Vibeke Kruse
Ulrik Christian Gyldenløve, Count of Samsø (1678–1719), Danish navy Admiral and son of Christian V of Denmark
Ulrik Frederik Gyldenløve, Count of Laurvig (1638–1704), King Frederick III of Denmark's illegitimate son
Ulrik Huber (1636–1694), professor of law at the University of Franeker and a political philosopher
Ulrik Imtiaz Rolfsen (born 1972), Pakistani Norwegian movie director
Ulrik Jansson (born 1968), former Swedish footballer
Ulrik Johansen (born 1980), Danish professional football player
Per-Ulrik Johansson (born 1966), Swedish golfer
Christian Ulrik Kastrup (1784–1850), Norwegian jurist, military officer and politician
Ulrik Frederik Lange (1808–1878), Norwegian politician
Ulrik Laursen (born 1976), Danish professional footballer
Ulrik le Fevre (born 1946), Danish former professional football player and manager
Kaj Ulrik Linderstrøm-Lang (1896–1959), Danish protein scientist and director of the Carlsberg Laboratory
Ulrik Lindgren (born 1955), Swedish Christian democratic politician
Ulrik Lindkvist (born 1981), Danish professional football (soccer) player
Lars Ulrik Mortensen, Danish harpsichordist and conductor
Ulrik Anton Motzfeldt (1807–1865), Norwegian jurist and politician
Ulrik Munther (born 1994), Swedish singer
Ulrik Neumann (1918–1994), Danish film actor and musician
Ulrik Olsen (1885–1963), the Norwegian Minister of Local Government Affairs
Harald Ulrik Sverdrup (politician) (1813–1891), Norwegian priest and politician
Søren Ulrik Thomsen (born 1956), Danish poet
Ulrik Torsslow (1801–1881), Swedish actor and theatre director
Søren Ulrik Vestergaard (born 1987), Danish professional football player
Adolf Ulrik Wertmüller (1751–1811), Swedish painter
Ulrik Frederik Cappelen (1797–1864), Norwegian jurist and politician
Ulrik Wilbek (born 1958), Danish team handball coach
Claes-Ulrik Winberg (1925–1989), Swedish industrialist and business executive

See also
Ulric (disambiguation)
Ulrica
Ulrich
Ulrike (disambiguation); feminine form
Ullrich

Notes 

Danish masculine given names
Norwegian masculine given names
Swedish masculine given names
Scandinavian masculine given names